Canthigaster natalensis, known as the Natal toby, is a species of pufferfish in the family Tetraodontidae. It is native to the southwestern Indian Ocean, where it ranges from Mozambique and South Africa to Réunion and Mauritius. It is an oviparous species that reaches 8.6 cm (3.4 inches) SL.

References 

Fish described in 1870
natalensis
Fauna of the Indian Ocean